HMS Skipjack was a  of the British Royal Navy. She was built at Chatham Dockyard from 1888–1891. She was converted to a minesweeper in 1908–1909 and continued these duties during the First World War. Skipjack survived the war and was sold for scrap in 1920.

Design and construction
The Sharpshooter-class was designed under the leadership of William Henry White, the Director of Naval Construction, to be faster and more seaworthy than the preceding prototype torpedo gunboat,  and the three  ships, while carrying a heavier armament. As torpedo gunboats, they were intended to defend the fleet from attack by torpedo-boats, while being capable of carrying out torpedo attacks themselves.

The Sharpshooters were larger than the preceding ships, with a raised forecastle to improve seakeeping. Two triple-expansion steam engines, fed by four locomotive boilers, drove two propeller shafts. The use of locomotive boilers was not a success, with the machinery being unreliable and unable to provide the expected power. The machinery actually delivered  giving a speed of  when forced and  giving  under natural draft.

The ship was armed with two 4.7 inch (120 mm) QF guns mounted fore and aft on the ships centreline, backed up by four 3-pounder (47 mm) guns (two in single mounts on the ship's beam and two in casemates forward). Five 14-inch torpedo tubes were fitted (one fixed in the ship's bow and two twin mounts), with three reload torpedoes carried. The ship had a crew of 91.

Skipjack was laid down at Chatham dockyard on 4 July 1888  was launched on 30 April 1889 and completed in July 1891 at a cost of £59,531.

Service
On 26 June 1897 Skipjack was present at the Jubilee Fleet Review at Spithead, In 1898 Skipjack was sent to Palmers of Jarrow for refit. Skipjack had her locomotive boilers replaced by Reed water-tube boilers in early 1900, which increased power and reliability. Skipjack  took part in the Royal Navy's annual manoeuvres in July–August 1900, and again in 1901. In January 1901 she was a tender to the  cruiser  in Kingstown.

In 1905 Skipjack was in reserve, but after refit, she returned to active service as part of the Fishery Protection Squadron in 1907. In 1909 she was converted to a minesweeper, a conversion that resulted in her torpedo tubes being removed. On 8 October 1910 Skipjack arrested the French trawler G599, which had been caught fishing within British territorial waters in the Thames estuary. The skipper of the trawler was fined five guineas for the offence. In January 1911 Skipjack completed a refit at Chatham and returned to fishery protection duties in the North Sea.

First World War
On the outbreak of the First World War Skipjack joined the newly established Grand Fleet at Scapa Flow in Orkney. In August 1914, the minesweepers attached to the Grand Fleet, including Skipjack were employed on carrying out daily sweeps of the Pentland Firth. In early October 1914, as part of expensive Grand Fleet operations to protect a large convoy carrying Canadian troops across the Atlantic to England, Skipjack was led eight minesweeping gunboats on patrols between Orkney and Shetland. On 27 October, the battleship  struck a mine off Tory Island, north-west of Lough Swilly, and despite efforts to tow her to safety, sank later that day.

On 18 November 1914 Skipjack and the gunboat  were about to start a minesweeping run in the channel between Fair Island and North Ronaldsay when Skipjack commanding officer sighted the conning tower of the German submarine U-22. The two gunboats set off at full speed in pursuit, but the submarine outpaced them and dived to safety after a chase of 45 minutes. On the evening of 24 November 1914, the German submarine U-16 was off the east coast of Orkney when she was spotted by a group of trawlers that were minesweeping. The trawlers summoned nearby gunboats, and at 1 pm the next day, Skipjack spotted U-16, but the submarine dived to safety and escaped. While the German official history records that Skipjack fired on U-16, this is not confirmed by Skipjacks log or official report of the incident.

In early  May 1917 Skipjack and three other torpedo gunboats were sent to sweep a minefield laid by the German submarine UC-68 in the approaches to the Clyde which was holding up shipping from the Clyde and Liverpool. Skipjack was a member of the Second Fleet Sweeping Flotilla, based at Scapa Flow as part of the Grand Fleet, in July 1917. In 1918 she was a member of the 13th Fast Minesweeper Flotilla at Oban .

Disposal
Skipjack was sold for scrap to Hammond Land Foundry of Dublin on 23 February 1920.

Pennant numbers

Notes

References

Bibliography

 

Sharpshooter-class torpedo gunboats
Ships built in Chatham
1889 ships